Heikki Kähkönen (26 December 1891 – 30 June 1962) was a Finnish wrestler and Olympic medalist in Greco-Roman wrestling. Kähkönen competed at the 1920 Summer Olympics in Antwerp where he received a silver medal in Greco-Roman wrestling, the featherweight class.

References

External links
 

1891 births
1962 deaths
Olympic wrestlers of Finland
Wrestlers at the 1920 Summer Olympics
Finnish male sport wrestlers
Olympic silver medalists for Finland
Olympic medalists in wrestling
Medalists at the 1920 Summer Olympics
People from Rääkkylä
Sportspeople from North Karelia
19th-century Finnish people
20th-century Finnish people